This is a list of events that took place in 2018 relating to television in the United Kingdom.

Events

January

February

March

April

May

June

July

August

September

October

November

December

Top 10 most-watched television broadcasts of this year

BARB consolidated 7-day viewing figures
The Broadcasters' Audience Research Board (BARB) used this method of measurement until August 2018. Viewing figures details include +1 and HD channels. Highest rated single episode, instalment or match per channel.

Debuts

BBC

ITV

Channel 4

Channel 5

Other channels

Channels

New channels

Defunct channels

Rebranding channels

Television programmes

Changes of network affiliation

Returning this year after a break of one year or longer

Continuing television programmes

1920s

1930s

1950s

1960s

1970s

1980s

1990s

2000s

2010s

Ending this year

Deaths

See also
2018 in British music
2018 in British radio
2018 in the United Kingdom
List of British films of 2018

References